Mary Anna McCartney (born 28 August 1969) is a British photographer, documentary filmmaker, cookbook author, and Global Ambassador for Meat Free Monday. She is also the host for the Discovery+/Food Network vegan cooking show, Mary McCartney Serves It Up. McCartney is a daughter of musician and singer/songwriter Paul McCartney, and photographer/vegetarian activist Linda McCartney.

Early life
Mary McCartney was born on 28 August 1969 at Avenue Clinic in St John's Wood, London, England. She is the eldest biological child of Paul McCartney and Linda Eastman, and has four siblings Heather, Stella, James and Beatrice.

Photography and film
She is a British photographer. In 2015, she was chosen to photograph Queen Elizabeth II to celebrate the fact that she was the "longest-reigning British monarch in more than 1,000 years".

If These Walls Could Sing (2022)

McCartney directed the documentary If These Walls Could Sing. It is her feature documentary debut, about the history of Abbey Road Studios in London and the experiences and memories of the musicians who have played there. It was created as the centrepiece of Abbey Road Studios' 90th anniversary celebrations in November 2022.

It was announced in January 2021 that McCartney would direct a documentary about Abbey Road Studios. McCartney said "some of my earliest memories as a young child come from time spent at Abbey Road, I've long wanted to tell the story of this historic place." As well as her father Paul McCartney, contributions are reported to be from Jimmy Page, Kate Bush, Noel Gallagher, Liam Gallagher, Pink Floyd, John Williams, Celeste, Elton John, Giles Martin, and Shirley Bassey. Production is by Mercury Studios and Ventureland. McCartney said what she "wanted from the interviews was to drill down into those musicians really feel about Abbey Road. 'Do you really care about Abbey Road? It's a building and you recorded here, but whatever. Do you really care?' And I think from the interviews, you can really see they are thinking fondly about it."

Vegetarian and vegan cooking
McCartney grew up, along with the rest of her siblings, as a vegetarian. In 2009, McCartney along with her father Paul and sister Stella, launched Meatless Mondays in the United Kingdom.

Cookbooks
McCartney has written two vegetarian cookbooks, Food: Vegetarian Home Cooking (2012) and At My Table: Vegetarian Feasts for Family and Friends (2015).

McCartney is currently both a vegan and vegetarian chef. In 2021, she, Paul, and Stella McCartney veganized 90 of her mother's recipes, and released them as the vegan cookbook book, Linda McCartney's Family Kitchen: Over 90 Plant-Based Recipes to Save the Planet and Nourish the Soul.

Mary McCartney Serves It Up
McCartney launched Season 1 of the Discovery+/Food Network vegan cooking show, Mary McCartney Serves It Up, in February 2021, Season 2 in November 2021, and Season three in November 2022. The show was nominated for a Daytime Emmy Award in 2022.

Personal life
McCartney married Alistair Donald on 26 September 1998, and had two sons. After McCartney and Donald divorced, she married Simon Aboud in 2010. They have two sons.

Nominations and awards

Daytime Emmy Awards

Publications

Cookbooks
The Meat Free Monday Cookbook: A Full Menu for Every Monday of the Year (Kyle, 2011)  (Foreword by Paul, Stella, and Mary McCartney)
Food: Vegetarian Home Cooking (Chatto & Windus, 2012) 
At My Table: Vegetarian Feasts for Family and Friends (Chatto & Windus, 2014) 
McCartney, Linda (with Paul, Mary, and Stella McCartney). Linda McCartney's Family Kitchen: Over 90 Plant-Based Recipes to Save the Planet and Nourish the Soul. (Voracious/Little, Brown, 2021)

Photography
Mary McCartney: From Where I Stand (Thames & Hudson, 2010) 
Mary McCartney: Monochrome & Colour (GOST, 2014) 
Mary McCartney: Twelfth Night 15.12.13 (HENI, 2016) 
Mary McCartney: The White Horse (Rizzoli, 2018) 
Mary McCartney: Paris Nude (HENI, 2019)

Photography exhibitions
Off Pointe: A Photographic Study of the Royal Ballet After Hours, The Royal Opera House, London (2004) and presented by The Royal Photographic Society at Photo London (2019)
British Style Observed, National History Museum, London (2008)
From Where I Stand, National Portrait Gallery and Michael Hoppen Gallery, London (2010)
Linda McCartney and Mary McCartney: Mother, Daughter, Gagosian Gallery, New York (2015); and at Fotografiska, Stockholm (2018)
Undone. (2017, Toronto)

Films
''If These Walls Could Sing (2022) – Director

See also
 List of animal rights advocates

Further reading
Interview, 19 January 2020.
Mary McCartney Became an Artist With a Little Help from Linda and Paul. Wall Street Journal, 28 August 2018.

References

External links

 Linda McCartney's Family Kitchen – In Conversation with Paul, Mary and Stella (Paul McCartney Official Channel) – Interview, 6 October 2021

1969 births
Living people
Artists from London
British portrait photographers
British vegetarianism activists
English cookbook writers
English people of American descent
English people of German-Jewish descent
English people of Irish descent
English people of Russian-Jewish descent
English women activists
English women photographers
Food Network original programming
2020s American cooking television series
Mary
Photographers from London
Plant-based diet advocates
Vegetarian cookbook writers
Vegan cookbook writers
Women cookbook writers